John Edward Jones (3 July 1913 – 26 January 1995) was an English professional footballer who played for Everton and Sunderland. Originally a centre-forward, he eventually became a full-back. He made his Everton debut in April 1934, in a 2–0 win against Leeds United. After making 108 appearances for Everton he joined Sunderland in 1938.

References

1913 births
1995 deaths
English footballers
Association football defenders
English Football League players
Everton F.C. players
Sunderland A.F.C. players